The Handspring Puppet Company is a puppetry performance and design company established in 1981 by Adrian Kohler, Basil Jones, Jon Weinberg and Jill Joubert. It is based in Cape Town, South Africa.

History 
Jones and Kohler met at the Michaelis School of Fine Art in Cape Town. At first, they designed puppets for children-targeted productions, which Jones initially disliked. Kohler "introduced him [Jones] to the West African tradition of puppetry for adults," working with Malcolm Purkey and Barney Simon, among others.

Productions 
Some notable productions include:

Episodes of an Easter Rising 
Esther van Ryswyk directed Episodes of an Easter Rising (1985), a play based on David Lytton's radio special of the same name. It told the story of two white lesbian women who became part of South Africa's anti-apartheid struggle. It premiered at the Baxter Theatre in Cape Town and toured to the National Arts Festival in Makhanda (formerly Grahamstown), WITS University Theatre in Johannesburg and to the 7th World Festival of Puppet Theatre in Charleville-Mézières, France.

Ubu and the Truth Commission 
In 1997, they worked with William Kentridge (director) and Jane Taylor (scriptwriter) on Ubu and the Truth Commission. The play draws extensively on Alfred Jarry's absurdist production Ubu Roi (1896). It fuses the chaos of the Ubu legend with original testimony from witnesses at the post-apartheid Truth and Reconciliation Commission (TRC). It highlights Kentridge's work in the evolution of truth through a combination of fictional narratives and facts. The production premiered in Weimer, Germany on 17 June 1997. Over the next two years, it toured to 38 theatres in South Africa, Europe and the USA.

Tall Horse 
Tall Horse (directed by Marthinus Basson in 2004) was a collaboration between the Sogolon Puppet Troupe of Mali and Handspring Puppet Company. The production was based on historical events: in 1827 the Pasha of Egypt, Muhammad Ali, sent a giraffe as a gift to King Charles X of France. The play dramatised the giraffe's journey across the Mediterranean Sea and the politics underlying it. With initial funding from the John F. Kennedy Centre in Washington, D.C, Tall Horse was also supported by  Anglo Gold Ashanti, a mining company with interests in both Mali and South Africa.

War Horse 

The Handspring Puppet Company achieved critical acclaim when War Horse featuring life-size puppets they had created, premiered at the Royal National Theatre in South Bank, London, on 17 October 2007. Kohler and Jones worked with directors Marianne Elliott and Tom Morris and choreographer Toby Sedgwick to design and construct life-sized horse puppets, each controlled by three actors. Two actors operate the legs and a third controls the head and neck, with all three actors providing a variety of sound effects. The company won an Olivier Award, Evening Standard Theatre Award and London Critics' Circle Theatre Award. The show transferred to the West End on 28 March 2009, and on 15 March 2011, it premiered on Broadway at the Vivian Beaumont Theater in New York City. The play has been performed globally to nearly eight million people worldwide.

Or You Could Kiss Me 
The company collaborated with Neil Bartlett and Rae Smith on Or You Could Kiss Me, which opened at London's National Theatre on 5 October 2010, for a six-week season. The show has been described as "an intimate history of two very private lives, lived in extraordinary times". It was loosely based on the lives of Kohler and Jones, and speculated on their future circumstances when both men reach the age of 85.

Exhibitions 

 Unmasking the Puppet —1987 This exhibition opened at the UNISA Gallery in Pretoria and toured to the Johannesburg Art Gallery, the Durban Art Museum, the Tatham Art Gallery in Pietermaritzburg, and the South African National Gallery in Cape Town.
 Episodes 2001–2003 Presented in various venues across South Africa, this installation included puppets from seven productions created over 16 years. Episodes represented a retrospective of Handspring's work. The exhibition was sponsored by the Goodman Gallery.
 Patrimony 2004–2005 An exhibition of Bamana Puppets from Mali, it featured puppets from the extensive family collection of Yaya Coulibali. It toured South Africa.
 At Arms Length – The Art of African Puppetry – 2006 Produced by the Museum for African Art (now known as The Africa Center, New York), this exhibit presented nearly 100 animated puppets, marionettes and puppet sculptures used in traditional and contemporary theatrical performances from Handspring and the Sogolon Puppet Troupe from Mali.
The Puppet Show – 2008  Produced by the Institute of Contemporary Art, Philadelphia, USA at the Pennsylvania State University and the Frye Art Museum in Seattle. Here the kinetic work of leading contemporary artists was set off against a backdrop of more puppeteers from the world of professional theatre.
KKNK National Art Festival – 2011 Selected as a featured visual artist for solo exhibition at the Klein Karoo National Arts Festival, held annually in Oudtshoorn, South Africa, Handspring Puppet Company exhibited puppets featured in performances in the preceding 2 years that were in line for further international touring.
National Theatre Gallery London – 2012  This exhibition explained the puppet-making process for War Horse.
Circa Gallery, Johannesburg – 2016 An exhibition of Joey and Topthorn, characters from War Horse, together with portraits of puppets in the Handspring archives which Kohler had realised as editioned linocut prints.

Awards

Theatrical Awards 
2007 Evening Standard Awards

Best Design (Rae Smith and the Handspring Puppet Company, winner)

2007 Critics' Circle Theatre Awards

Best Designer (Basil Jones, Adrian Kohler, Rae Smith and the Handspring Puppet Company, winner)

2008 Laurence Olivier Awards

Best Set Design (Rae Smith, Basil Jones and Adrian Kohler, winner)

 2011 Tony Awards

Adrian Kohler and Basil Jones won the Special Tony Award for War Horse.

2011 Outer Critics Circle Awards

Outer Critics Circle Special Achievement Award for "Puppet Design, Fabrication and Direction for War Horse"

Honorary Awards 
2012 – Honorary Doctorate of Literature Kohler and Jones both received an honorary doctorate in literature from the University of Cape Town, South Africa.

2018 – John F. Kennedy Gold Medal Kohler and Jones received the John F. Kennedy Gold Medal in the Arts from the Kennedy Center International Committee on the Arts at a ceremony held at the Zeitz Museum of Contemporary Art Africa.

Production Schedule

Notes

References 
Kentridge, William. "Director's Note". In Ubu and the Truth Commission, by Jane Taylor, viii–xv. Cape Town: University of Cape Town Press, 2007.
 Jones, Basil, and Adrian Kohler. "Puppeteers' Note". In Ubu and the Truth Commission, by Jane Taylor, xvi–xvii. Cape Town: University of Cape Town Press, 2007.

External links 

 
War Horse on Stage: Official Site

Entertainment companies of South Africa
Companies based in Cape Town
Cape Town culture
Laurence Olivier Award winners
Tony Award winners
Puppet troupes
Arts organizations established in 1988
Recipients of the Molteno medal